Sidney Bowser (6 April 1891 – 10 February 1961), better known as Sid Bowser, was an English footballer who played at inside-left and centre-half.

Career
Bowser was born in Handsworth, Birmingham. He joined West Bromwich Albion in July 1908 and remained with the club for five years. He moved to Belfast Distillery in April 1913, but re-joined Albion the following February. Bowser guested for Stoke in 1918–19, making ten appearances scoring five goals. He signed for Walsall in August 1924 before retiring in May 1927. He died in Birmingham in 1961.

Career statistics
Source:

References
 

1891 births
1961 deaths
Footballers from Birmingham, West Midlands
English footballers
England international footballers
Association football forwards
West Bromwich Albion F.C. players
Lisburn Distillery F.C. players
Walsall F.C. players
English Football League players
Stoke City F.C. wartime guest players
Footballers from Handsworth, West Midlands
FA Cup Final players